Heinrich Schurtz (born 11 December 1863 in Zwickau; died 2 May 1903 in Bremen) was a German ethnologist and historian. His most significant work is said to be Altersklassen und Männerbünde (Age-classes and Male Bands) which emphasized the role gender and generational issues have in social institutions and argued that basing the society on the family was a step backwards. His notion of Männerbünde placed male associations, where he deemed masculinity more "unfettered", in opposition to the family which he saw as dominated by women. Notions of Männerbünde, though not just Schurtz's, would have an influence on Nazi Germany's SS while in a very different way his ideas on same-sex bonding has become of historical interest to Queer studies.

References 

German ethnologists
19th-century German historians
Academic staff of Leipzig University
People from Zwickau
1863 births
1903 deaths
German male non-fiction writers